is a city located in the western portion of Tokyo Metropolis, Japan. , the city had an estimated population of 126,791, and a population density of 11,000 persons per km².

Geography
Kokubunji is located on the Musashino Terrace of western Tokyo, approximately in the geographic centre of mainland Tokyo Metropolis. The city extends for about 5.68 kilometers east-to-west by about 3.86 kilometers north-to-south.

Surrounding municipalities
Tokyo Metropolis
Fuchū
Kunitachi
Tachikawa
Kodaira
Koganei

Climate
Kokubunji has a humid subtropical climate (Köppen Cfa) characterized by warm summers and cool winters with light to no snowfall.  The average annual temperature in Kokubunji is 14.0 °C. The average annual rainfall is 1647 mm, with September as the wettest month. The temperatures are highest on average in August (at around 25.5 °C) and lowest in January (at around 2.6 °C).

Demographics
Per Japanese census data, the population of Kokubunji increased rapidly in the 1950s and 1960s.

History
The area of present-day Kokubunji was part of ancient Musashi Province, and was the site of the Nara period Provincial temple of that province. In the post-Meiji Restoration cadastral reform of 1878, the area became part of Kitatama District in Kanagawa Prefecture. The village of Kokubunji was created on April 1, 1889 with the establishment of the modern municipalities system. Kitatama District was transferred to the administrative control of Tokyo Metropolis on April 1, 1893. Kokubunji was elevated to town status in 1940, and to city status on November 3, 1964.

Government
Kokubunji has a mayor-council form of government with a directly elected mayor and a unicameral city council of 22 members. Kokubunji, together with the city of Kunitachi, contributes two members to the Tokyo Metropolitan Assembly. In terms of national politics, the city is part of Tokyo 19th district of the lower house of the Diet of Japan.

Economy 
Kokubunji is the home of the Hitachi Central Research Laboratory, which contains one of the largest natural preserves in the area surrounding Tokyo. The Railway Technical Research Institute, the technical research company under the Japan Railways group of companies is also located in Kokubunji.

Education
The city has one public high school, which is operated by the Tokyo Metropolitan Government Board of Education.

Kokubunji has ten public elementary schools and five public middle schools.

Municipal junior high schools:
 No. 1 (第一中学校)
 No. 2 (第二中学校)
 No. 3 (第三中学校)
 No. 4 (第四中学校)
 No. 5 (第五中学校)

Municipal elementary schools:
 No. 1 (第一小学校)
 No. 2 (第二小学校)
 No. 3 (第三小学校)
 No. 4 (第四小学校)
 No. 5 (第五小学校)
 No. 6 (第六小学校)
 No. 7 (第七小学校)
 No. 8 (第八小学校)
 No. 9 (第九小学校)
 No. 10 (第十小学校)

There is also one private K-12 school, affiliated with Waseda University: .

Tokyo Keizai University has a campus at Kokubunji.

Transportation

Railway
 JR East –  Chūō Main Line
 -  
 JR East –  Musashino Line
Nishi-Kokubunji
 Seibu Railway - Seibu Kokubunji Line
 - 
 Seibu Railway - Seibu Tamako Line
Kokubunji

Highway
Kokubunji is not served by any national highways or expressways.

Sister city relations
 – Marion, South Australia, Australia

Local attractions
 Site of Musashi kokubunji
 Tonogayato Garden

References

External links

Kokubunji City Official Website 

 
Cities in Tokyo
Western Tokyo